Soda is a small village in Malpura tehsil, Tonk district, Rajasthan, India.

Soda village is famous for being the first Internet panchayat in India. Chhavi Rajawat is the youngest woman sarpanch of Soda.

References

External links
 The official website of Soda, Rajasthan
 

Villages in Tonk district